Manuel "Manolo" Peña Escontrela (18 December 1965 – 13 November 2012) was a Spanish professional footballer who played as a forward.

Over the course of ten seasons, he amassed La Liga totals of 189 games and 27 goals, with Valladolid and Zaragoza.

Club career
Born in Lugo, Galicia, Peña signed at the age of 17 with Real Valladolid, going on to play seven consecutive La Liga seasons with the club, but only appearing in 30 league games his first three combined. His best output for the Castile and León side came in the 1987–88 campaign when he scored eight goals in 29 matches (all starts) to help them finish in eighth position; this included a hat-trick against FC Barcelona at the Camp Nou in a 4–2 win, and another in the home game against the Catalans (1–1 draw).

Still at the professional level, Peña played with Real Zaragoza (top level) and Cádiz CF (being relegated from Segunda División in 1993–94). He retired in June 2000 after six years in the lower leagues, mainly with SD Ponferradina where he started his career.

International career
Peña earned a total of 14 caps for four Spanish youth teams. He helped the under-20s finish second at the 1985 FIFA World Youth Championship in the Soviet Union, appearing in the group stage against Brazil (0–2 loss) and the Republic of Ireland (4–2 win).

Later life and death
After retiring, Peña settled in Ponferrada and worked in the city council. He died on 13 November 2012 from cancer, at the age of 46.

References

External links

Stats and bio at Cadistas1910 

1965 births
2012 deaths
Spanish footballers
Footballers from Lugo
Association football forwards
La Liga players
Segunda División players
Segunda División B players
Tercera División players
SD Ponferradina players
Real Valladolid players
Real Zaragoza players
Cádiz CF players
Spain youth international footballers
Spain under-21 international footballers
Spain under-23 international footballers